Daniela Stavreva (born 26 August 1958) is a Bulgarian rower. She competed in the women's eight event at the 1980 Summer Olympics.

References

External links
 

1958 births
Living people
Bulgarian female rowers
Olympic rowers of Bulgaria
Rowers at the 1980 Summer Olympics
Place of birth missing (living people)